The South Coast 26 is an American trailerable sailboat that was designed by James Monroe as a cruiser and first built in 1977.

Production
The design was built by South Coast Seacraft in United States, starting in 1977, but it is now out of production.

Design
The South Coast 26 is a recreational keelboat, built predominantly of fiberglass, with wood trim. It has a masthead sloop rig; a raked stem; a reverse transom; a transom-hung, vertically-lifting wooden rudder controlled by a tiller and a lifting keel with a weighted bulb. It was built in aft cockpit and center cockpit versions. It displaces  and carries  of ballast.

The boat is normally fitted with a small outboard motor for docking and maneuvering.

The design has sleeping accommodation for four people, with a double "V"-berth in the bow cabin and two straight settee berths in the main cabin. The galley is located on the starboard side just forward of the companionway ladder. The galley is equipped with a two-burner stove. The enclosed head is located opposite the galley on the port side.

For sailing the design may be equipped with a 150% or 170% genoa.

Operational history
The boat is supported by an active class club that organizes racing events, the South Coast Seacraft Owners' Association.

See also
List of sailing boat types

References

External links
Photo of a South Coast 26
Photo of a South Coast 26 on a hoist, showing keel

Keelboats
1970s sailboat type designs
Sailing yachts
Trailer sailers
Sailboat type designs by James Monroe
Sailboat types built by South Coast Seacraft